Murder on the Second Floor is a play by Frank Vosper. The 1929 Broadway play was produced by Albert H. Woods and directed by William Mollison.

Cast 
 Charles Brown as Joseph Reynolds 	 
 O. B. Clarence as Edward Armitage 	 
 Florence Edney as Mrs. Rose Armitage 	 
 Phyllis Konstam as Sylvia Armitage 	 
 Viola Lyel as Lucy Timson 	 
 Laurence Olivier as Hugh Bromilow 	 
 George Probert as Jam Singh 	 
 John R. Turnbull as A Police Inspector 	 
 Henry Warwick as A Police Constable 	 
 Drusilla Wills as Miss Snell

Adaptations 
The play was adapted into the films Murder on the Second Floor (1932) and Shadows on the Stairs (1941) and for television as Murder on the Second Floor (1939). Vosper adapted the play into a novel of the same name, published in 1930.

External links 

Broadway plays
1929 plays
British plays adapted into films
West End plays
Plays by Frank Vosper